The 2018–19 Algerian Women's Championship was the 21st season of the Algerian Women's Championship, the Algerian national women's association football competition.
AS Sureté Nationale won the competition after a close battle with Afak Relizane, winning the league by one point after a final day victory against ASE Alger Centre. SMB Touggourt finished bottom of the league after failing to gain a single point, losing all 22 of their fixtures with a goal difference of -129.

In previous seasons, the league season had been split up into East and West sections, with the top six teams qualifying for a final championship round to determine the overall league champion. The 2018-19 season introduced a new, more straight-forward double round-robin, with the winner being the team with the most points after the 22 game season.

Clubs

Standings

References

External links
Algerian Women's Championship - goalzz.com
 = Ligue Nationale du Football Femenin (In French)

Algerian Women's Championship seasons